Kurt Stein (born June 30, 1970) is an American former ski jumper who competed in the 1992 Winter Olympics and the 1994 Winter Olympics. Stein was inducted into the American Ski Jumping Hall of Fame in 2008.

References

1970 births
Living people
American male ski jumpers
Olympic ski jumpers of the United States
Ski jumpers at the 1994 Winter Olympics